The Freedom 36 Cat Ketch, also called the Freedom 36 CC,  is an American sailboat, that was designed by Gary Mull and first built in 1985. The design is out of production.

Production
The boat was built by Tillotson Pearson in the United States for Freedom Yachts.

Design
The Freedom 36 Cat Ketch is a small recreational keelboat, built predominantly of fiberglass, with wood trim. It has a free-standing ketch rig, with the aft mast slightly shorter than the fore mast and both masts rigged with cat sails, an internally-mounted spade-type rudder and a fixed fin keel. With the standard keel it displaces  and carries  of ballast.

The boat has a PHRF racing average handicap of 144 with a high of 153 and low of 141.

See also
List of sailing boat types

References

Keelboats
1980s sailboat type designs
Sailing yachts
Sailboat type designs by Gary Mull
Sailboat types built by Pearson Yachts